K1, K.I, K01, K 1 or K-1 can refer to:

Geography
 K1, another name for Masherbrum, a mountain in the Karakoram range in Pakistan
 K1, a small town to north of Kirkuk city, Iraq 
 K1 (building), a high-rise building in Kraków, Poland

Mathematics
  denotes the  first algebraic K-theory group of a ring .

Military
 Denel K1, a South African mortar
 Daewoo Precision Industries K1, a carbine of the South Korean army
 EMER K-1, a Burmese assault rifle designated EMERK
 Fokker K.I, a World War I German experimental aircraft
 Kucher Model K1, a Hungarian submachine gun
 , a World War I British submarine
 HMS Acanthus (K01) / HNoMS Andenes (K01), a 1939 British, then Norwegian Flower-class corvette
 K1 88-Tank, a modern main battle tank of the South Korean military
 K-1 cart a United States Signal Corps cart for carrying signal equipment
 K 1, a designation for a Swedish cavalry regiment
 K1-class gunboat, planned World War II German gunboat
 K1, a World War II Dutch sloop operated by the German Navy
 Skoda K-1, of the Skoda K series, a World War II Czechoslovak howitzer
 USS K-1 (SS-32), a 1913 United States Navy K class of submarine
 K-1 Airfield, former name of the Gimhae Air Base
 Soviet submarine K-1
 IVL K.1 Kurki, a Finnish trainer aircraft

Names
 An abbreviation of Keiichi Morisato, a character in the manga/anime Oh My Goddess!
 First name of Keiichi Maebara, a character in Higurashi When They Cry franchise
 K1, a nickname given to Kyler Murray (born 1997), American football quarterback

Transportation

Road transport
 BMW K1, a sport bike
 K-1 Attack, a Slovak sports car
 K-1 (Kansas highway), a state highway in Kansas
 London Buses route K1, a Transport for London contracted bus route 
 Tatra K1, a 1967 Czechoslovakian experimental tramcar

Steam locomotives
 Furness Railway K1, a steam locomotive class related to the Furness Railway K2
 GSR Class K1, a Great Southern Railway Irish steam locomotive
 LNER Thompson/Peppercorn Class K1, a 1949 British 2-6-0 (mogul) steam locomotive class
 LNER Class K1, a class of British steam locomotives 
 NCC Class K1, a Northern Counties Committee Irish steam locomotive
 PRR K1, a Pennsylvania Railroad locomotive classification
 SR K1 class, a British 2-6-0 steam locomotive
 the first 1909 Tasmanian Government Railways K class Garratt, a type of articulated steam locomotive

Water transport
 K1 Britannia, the replica of His Majesty's Yacht Britannia built in 1893 for Commodore Albert Edward, Prince of Wales
 The class/racing number on HMY Britannia's main sail
 K1, a canoe racing event under the International Canoe Federation

Other vehicles
 K-1 (rocket), an aerospace vehicle under development by Rocketplane Kistler

Electronics
 Kawai K1, a digital synthesizer
 Magnetophon K1, the first tape recorder, produced in Germany in 1935
 Motorola KRZR K1, a mobile phone
 Sendo K1, a model of Sendo mobile phone
 Pentax K-1, a digital single-lens reflex camera
 Pentax K-01, a digital mirrorless interchangeable lens camera
 Tegra K1, an Nvidia system on a chip for mobile devices

United States government forms
 K-1 visa, a United States immigration visa (also called the fiancé(e) visa)
 Schedule K-1, a tax form of the United States Internal Revenue Service (IRS) corresponding with Form 1065 to report one's share of income in a flow-through entity

Music
K. 1 can designate:
 six works by Wolfgang Amadeus Mozart:
K. 1a, an Andante in C for Keyboard
K. 1b, an Allegro in C for Keyboard
K. 1c, an Allegro in F for Keyboard
K. 1d, a Minuet in F for Keyboard
K. 1e, a Minuet in G for Keyboard
K. 1f, a Minuet in C for Keyboard
 Kk. 1 or K. 1, a sonata for keyboard by Scarlatti; see List of solo keyboard sonatas by Domenico Scarlatti
 Kay One (born 1984), German rapper
 Kingz One, a music group created in 2003

Miscellaneous
 Family K1, a set of New Testament manuscripts
 K1 or K-1, an abbreviation for kerosene heating fuel
 K1, a Larcum Kendall marine chronometer (1769)
 K-1, a kickboxing promotion
 Haplogroup LT or K1, a Y-chromosome DNA haplogroup
 K1, an alternative title for Kommune 1
 k1, a coefficient that encapsulates process-related factors, limiting the minimum feature size in photolithography 
K1 fund, a suspected German Ponzi-scheme
 an abbreviation for KotOR 1
 K1, a common name for the vitamin phylloquinone